Bass (also called bottom end) describes tones of low (also called "deep") frequency, pitch and range from 16 to 256 Hz (C0 to middle C4) and bass instruments that produce tones in the low-pitched range C2-C4. They belong to different families of instruments and can cover a wide range of musical roles. Since producing low pitches usually requires a long air column or string, and for stringed instruments, a large hollow body, the string and wind bass instruments are usually the largest instruments in their families or instrument classes.

Musical role
When bass notes are played in a musical ensemble such an orchestra, they are frequently used to provide a counterpoint or counter-melody, in a harmonic context either to outline or juxtapose the progression of the chords, or with percussion to underline the rhythm.

Rhythm section 
In popular music, the bass part, which is called the "bassline", typically provides harmonic and rhythmic support to the band. The bass player is a member of the rhythm section in a band, along with the drummer, rhythm guitarist, and, in some cases, a keyboard instrument player (e.g., piano or Hammond organ). The bass player emphasizes the root or fifth of the chord in their basslines (and to a lesser degree, the third of the chord) and accents the strong beats.

Kinds of bass harmony
In classical music, different forms of bass are: basso concertante, or basso recitante; the bass voice of the chorus; the bass which accompanies the softer passages of a composition, as well as those passages which employ the whole power of the ensemble, generally played by the violoncellos in orchestral music; contrabass (“under bass”), is described as that part which is performed by the double basses; violoncellos often play the same line an octave higher, or a different melodic or rhythmic part which is not a bassline when double basses are used; basso ripieno; that bass which joins in the full passages of a composition, and, by its depth of tone and energy of stroke, affords a powerful contrast to the lighter and softer passages or movements.

Basso continuo was an approach to writing music during the Baroque music era (1600-1750). With basso continuo, a written-out bassline served to set out the chord progression for an entire piece (symphony, concerto, Mass, or other work), with the bassline being played by pipe organ or harpsichord and the chords being improvised by players of chordal instruments (theorbo, lute, harpsichord, etc.).

"The bass differs from other voices because of the particular role it plays in supporting and defining harmonic motion. It does so at levels ranging from immediate, chord-by-chord events to the larger harmonic organization of an entire work."

Instruments
As seen in the musical instrument classification article, categorizing instruments can be difficult. For example, some instruments fall into more than one category. The cello is considered a tenor instrument in some orchestral settings, but in a string quartet it is the bass instrument. Also, the Bass Flute is actually the tenor member of the flute family even though it is called the "Bass" Flute.

Examples grouped by general form and playing technique include:
Double bass from the viol or violin family (usually the instrument referred to as a "bass" in European classical music and jazz. Sometimes called a "string bass" to differentiate it from a "brass bass" or "bass horn", or an "upright bass" to differentiate it from a "bass guitar")
Bass guitar and acoustic bass guitar, instruments shaped, constructed and held (or worn) like guitars, that play in the bass range. The electric bass guitar is usually the instrument referred to as a "bass" in pop and rock music.
A bass horn, such as a tuba, serpent, and sousaphone from the wind family and low-tuned versions of specific types of brass and woodwind instruments, such as bassoon, bass clarinet, bass trombone and bass saxophone, etc. (less common usage)
Keyboard bass, a keyboard alternative to the bass guitar or double bass (e.g. the Fender Rhodes piano bass in the 1960s or 13-note MIDI keyboard controllers in the 2000s)
Washtub bass, a simple folk instrument

A musician playing one of these instruments is often known as a bassist. Other more specific terms such as 'bass guitarist', 'double bassist', 'bass player', etc. may also be used.

Keyboards
Keyboard bass
Pedal keyboard

Percussion

Unpitched
Bass drum

Pitched
Timpani

Stringed
Double bass
Bass guitar
Washtub bass
Cello

Wind

Woodwind 

Bass recorder
Bass oboe
Bassoon
Contrabassoon
Bass saxophone
Contrabass saxophone
Subcontrabass saxophone
Bass clarinet
Contrabass clarinet
Contrabass flute

Brass
Tuba
Subcontrabass tuba
Bass trombone
Euphonium
Baritone Horn

Music shows and dances

With recorded music playback, for owners of 33 rpm LPs and 45 singles, the availability of loud and deep bass was limited by the ability of the phonograph record stylus to track the groove. While some hi-fi aficionados had solved the problem by using other playback sources, such as reel-to-reel tape players which were capable of delivering accurate, naturally deep bass from acoustic sources, or synthetic bass not found in nature, with the popular introduction of the compact cassette in the late 1960s it became possible to add more low frequency content to recordings. By the mid-1970s, 12" vinyl singles, which allowed for "more bass volume", were used to record disco, reggae, dub and hip-hop tracks; dance club DJs played these records in clubs with subwoofers to achieve "physical and emotional" reactions from dancers.

In the early 1970s, early disco DJs sought out deeper bass sounds for their dance events. David Mancuso hired sound engineer Alex Rosner to design additional subwoofers for his disco dance events, along with "tweeter arrays" to "boost the treble and bass at opportune moments" at his private, underground parties at The Loft. The demand for sub-bass sound reinforcement in the 1970s was driven by the important role of "powerful bass drum" in disco, as compared with rock and pop; to provide this deeper range, a third crossover point from 40 Hz to 120 Hz (centering on 80 Hz) was added. The Paradise Garage discotheque in New York City, which operated from 1977 to 1987, had "custom designed 'sub-bass' speakers" developed by Alex Rosner's disciple, sound engineer Richard ("Dick") Long that were called "Levan Horns" (in honor of resident DJ Larry Levan).

By the end of the 1970s, subwoofers were used in dance venue sound systems to enable the playing of "[b]ass-heavy dance music" that we "do not 'hear' with our ears but with our entire body". At the club, Long used four Levan bass horns, one in each corner of the dancefloor, to create a "haptic and tactile quality" in the sub-bass that you could feel in your body. To overcome the lack of sub-bass frequencies on 1970s disco records (sub-bass frequencies below 60 Hz were removed during mastering), Long added a DBX 100 "Boom Box" subharmonic pitch generator into his system to synthesize 25 Hz to 50 Hz sub-bass from the 50 to 100 Hz bass on the records. In the early 1980s, Long designed a sound system for the Warehouse dance club, with "huge stacks of subwoofers" which created "deep and intense" bass frequencies that "pound[ed] through your system" and "entire body", enabling clubgoers to "viscerally experience" the DJs' house music mixes.

Deep, heavy bass is central to Jamaican musical styles such as dub and reggae. In Jamaica in the 1970s and 1980s, sound engineers for reggae sound systems began creating "heavily customized" subwoofer enclosures by adding foam and tuning the cabinets to achieve "rich and articulate speaker output below 100 Hz". The sound engineers who developed the "bass-heavy signature sound" of sound reinforcement systems have been called "deserving as much credit for the sound of Jamaican music as their better-known music producer cousins". The sound engineers for Stone Love Movement (a sound system crew), for example, modified folded horn subwoofers they imported from the US to get more of a bass reflex sound that suited local tone preferences for dancehall audiences, as the unmodified folded horn was found to be "too aggressive" sounding and "not deep enough for Jamaican listeners".

In Jamaican sound system culture, there are both "low and high bass bins" in "towering piles" that are "delivered in large trucks" and set up by a crew of "box boys", and then positioned and adjusted by the sound engineer in a process known as "stringing up", all to create the "sound of reggae music you can literally feel as it comes off these big speakers". Sound system crews hold 'sound clash' competitions, where each sound system is set up and then the two crews try to outdo each other.

Movies
The use of subwoofers to provide deep bass in film presentations received a great deal of publicity in 1974 with the movie Earthquake which was released in Sensurround. Initially installed in 17 U.S. theaters, the Cerwin Vega "Sensurround" system used large subwoofers which were driven by racks of 500 watt amplifiers which were triggered by control tones printed on one of the audio tracks on the film. Four of the subwoofers were positioned in front of the audience under (or behind) the film screen and two more were placed together at the rear of the audience on a platform. Powerful noise energy and loud rumbling in the range of 17 Hz to 120 Hz was generated at the level of 110–120 decibels of sound pressure level, abbreviated dB(SPL). The new low frequency entertainment method helped the film become a box office success. More Sensurround systems were assembled and installed. By 1976 there were almost 300 Sensurround systems leapfrogging through select theaters. Other films to use the effect include the WW II naval battle epic Midway in 1976 and Rollercoaster in 1977.

See also
Sub bass
Treble (sound)
Bass clef
Figured bass

Sources

Further reading

External links

 
Contrabass instruments